Vico Hui Ho Luek (born ) is a Hong Kong-based businessman. 

Until June/July 2012 he was the chairman of the English football club Birmingham City F.C. and chief executive officer of Birmingham International Holdings.

References

1960s births
Birmingham City F.C. directors and chairmen
Living people